Country bohemian style is a fashion style synthesizing rural elements with the bohemian style, creating a bohemian approach to life in the country. The country bohemian style can refer to both fashion and interior design.

Characteristics
The country bohemian style is a deliberate blending of two seemingly disparate styles, country and bohemian. It incorporates local, rural features into bohemian sensibilities, favoring sustainability and rustic features while also embracing modern contributions.

See also
Boho-chic
Bohemian style
Shabby chic

References
Footnotes

2010s fashion
Interior design